Alexander John MacRae (25 December 1889 – 30 November 1938) was a sports entrepreneur and clothing manufacturer.  Born in Scotland, he emigrated to Australia where, in 1914, he founded the company that became the swimwear giant Speedo.

Biography

Early life
MacRae was born on Christmas Day 1889 in Applecross, Ross, Scotland, the son of Murdo and Mary MacRae.  In 1910, he immigrated to Australia.

Career
It was in 1914 that he founded the hosiery company MacRae Knitting Mills in Regent St Sydney, Australia. In 1918, the company moved into a larger factory in Camperdown. The company was growing quickly, which required more space to manufacture what was becoming an icon of Australia. In 1928, a competition was held to see who could come up with a new name for the business.  The name "Speedo" was born and it is the company's name to this day. Later, he flew to America and set the business up there.

Personal life
He married Martha MacRae. They had five sons and a daughter: Alisdair, William, James, Ronald, Duncan, and Jean. All of their sons became directors of Speedo.

References

1889 births
1938 deaths
Australian sports businesspeople
Scottish emigrants to Australia
Speedo